The 2022 California Golden Bears football team represented the University of California, Berkeley during the 2022 NCAA Division I FBS football season. The team is led by head coach Justin Wilcox, in his sixth year. The team plays their home games at California Memorial Stadium as a member of the Pac-12 Conference.

Schedule

Roster

Game summaries

vs UC Davis (FCS)

vs UNLV

at Notre Dame

vs Arizona

at Washington State

at Colorado

vs Washington

vs No. 8 Oregon

at No. 9 USC

at Oregon State

vs Stanford

vs No. 18 UCLA

Rankings

References

California
California Golden Bears football seasons
California Golden Bears football